The Democratic Alliance for Niger (ADN-Fusaha) is a political party in Niger.

History
The ADN was established in 2014 by Minister of Urban Development and Housing Habi Mahamadou Salissou. 

It did not nominate a presidential candidate in the 2016 general elections, but won a single seat in the National Assembly.

References

Political parties in Niger
Political parties established in 2014
2014 establishments in Niger